The New Zealand Patriot Party was a small far-right political party in New Zealand. It was founded by Sid Wilson, formerly the secretary and Auckland regional leader of the New Zealand National Front. Wilson failed to convince any other NZNF officials to join him, and Wilson subsequently returned to the National Front.

Defunct political parties in New Zealand
Far-right politics in New Zealand